Entraygues-sur-Truyère (Languedocien: Entraigas) is a commune in the Aveyron department in southern France.

Geography

Population

Transportation
Entraygues-sur-Truyère can be reached by bus from Aurillac (48 km) and from the industrial center of Rodez (55 km). The nearest train station and airport are located in Aurillac or Rodez.

Personality
Urbain Hémard (circa 1548-1592), French physician and dentist.

See also
List of medieval bridges in France

References

External links

 History on Aveyron.com

Communes of Aveyron
Rouergue
Aveyron communes articles needing translation from French Wikipedia